Hyperprosopon ellipticum, the silver surfperch, is a species of surfperch native to the eastern Pacific Ocean.  This species is also displayed in public aquariums.

Description
The body of the Silver surfperch is oval and strongly compressed. The head is small and the mouth is moderately large. The body is silvery with dusky (brownish to gray) coloration on the back and dusky bars on the sides. The tail is usually pink with an occasional orange spot on the anal fin. The specific name ellipticum refers to its elliptical body outline. It looks similar to the Walleye surfperch (H. argenteum) but lacks the black coloration on its pelvic fins.  This species can reach a length of  TL.

Range
Silver surfperch occur from Rio San Vicente, Baja California, to Schooner Cove, near Tofino, Vancouver Island, British Columbia. These small surfperch primarily frequent the sandy surf zone although they are also caught among shallow rocks from piers, and in bays.

Natural history
The diet of Silver surfperch includes shrimp, crustaceans, amphipods and algae. As with all surfperch, the young are born alive and are relatively large. Mating occurs during the fall and early winter months. The male approaches the female from below; both swim with vents close for 2 or 3 seconds, then separate and repeat the process. Three to 16 young are born the following spring and summer.

Fishing information
Silver surfperch rank among the top ten in numbers caught by recreational anglers in central and northern California, even though the average weight is 0.1 pound. They are plentiful, easy to catch and occur in large numbers in surf, shore and pier catches.

References
An  of this article was copied from California Marine Sportfish by the California Department of Fish and Game, Marine Region; a public domain resource.

External links
 Photograph

Silver surfperch
Fish described in 1854